Gymnopilus yangshanensis is a species of mushroom in the family Hymenogastraceae found in China.

See also
List of Gymnopilus species

References

Fungi described in 1990
Fungi of China
yangshanensis